Kuke is a village in Lääne-Nigula Parish, Lääne County in Estonia.

References

Villages in Lääne County